Aatish: Feel the Fire is a 1994 Indian Hindi-language action crime film directed by Sanjay Gupta in his directorial debut and starring Sanjay Dutt, Aditya Pancholi, Raveena Tandon, Karishma Kapoor and Atul Agnihotri in lead roles. The supporting cast includes Shakti Kapoor, Gulshan Grover, Kader Khan, Ajit, Tanuja and Ram Mohan.

The film marked Sanjay Gupta's directorial debut in Bollywood. The film reworks and combines elements from two earlier crime films, the Indian film Deewaar (1975) and the Hong Kong action film A Better Tomorrow (1986). Upon release, it grossed  at the Indian box office. It was remade into a Nepali film, Mahaan (2009), starring Biraj Bhatt.

Plot
Baba and Avinash are brothers who live in a shanty house with their widowed mother, who makes a living as a housemaid. When a stalker attempts to rape their mother, Baba knifes him to death, and the three, along with an orphan named Nawab, take shelter with an underworld don named Uncle. Baba would like Avinash to study and become a better person, and in order to do this, he decides to make crime his career. When Avinash completes his studies and wants to enroll himself in the police academy, Baba helps him monetarily by accepting his first contract killing. Avinash does complete his training at the police academy and soon becomes a police inspector. One of his first assignments is to be apprehended and arrest Baba and Nawab - much to his shock, as he had never associated his very own brother with having any criminal background. Avinash must now decide to proceed on with apprehending Baba and Nawab, or quit from the police force.

Cast
Sanjay Dutt as Baba
Aditya Pancholi as Nawab
Atul Agnihotri as Inspector Avinash "Avi"
Karishma Kapoor as Pooja
Raveena Tandon as Nisha
Shakti Kapoor as Sunny
Gulshan Grover as Kaniyya
Ajit as Uncle (underworld don)
Tanuja as Baba's Mother
Vishwajeet Pradhan as Gulam (Kania's brother)
Kader Khan as Kadar bhai
Ram Mohan as Police Commissioner
Dinesh Hingoo as Aar Paar
Tiku Talsania as Jarnail Singh
Mushtaq Khan as Bhiku

Production
Aatish is a remake of Deewaar (1975), written by Salim–Javed, with Sanjay Dutt as the older criminal brother (inspired by Amitabh Bachchan's character in Deewaar), Atul Agnihotri as the younger police brother, and Tanuja as the mother. Aatish had a story "straight out of Deewar" but added a twist, with the mother supporting the criminal brother. In addition, Aatish also unofficially reworked elements of John Woo's Hong Kong film, A Better Tomorrow (1986).

Soundtrack

Notes

References

External links
 

1994 films
1990s Hindi-language films
Films scored by Nadeem–Shravan
Indian action drama films
Indian crime drama films
Films with screenplays by Robin Bhatt
Remakes of Indian films
Indian remakes of Hong Kong films
Hindi films remade in other languages
1994 directorial debut films
Films directed by Sanjay Gupta
1990s action drama films
1994 crime drama films